Obdormition (from Latin obdormire "to fall asleep") is a medical term describing numbness in a limb, often caused by constant pressure on nerves or lack of movement.  This is colloquially referred to as the limb "going to sleep" and is usually followed by paresthesia, colloquially called "pins and needles".

References

Symptoms and signs: Nervous and musculoskeletal systems

he:אובדורמישן